Respect is the 8th self-released music cassette album by singer-songwriter Daniel Johnston, released in 1985. It features covers of the Elvis Presley song "Heartbreak Hotel" and the Bert Berns song "A Little Bit of Soap", made popular by The Jarmels.

Background 
Since it was recorded only one month following his last album, the context surrounding 'Respect' is essentially the same as that of Johnston's 'Retired Boxer' album. Johnston recorded both albums whilst living in an apartment leased to him by a local church in Austin, Texas. During recording, Johnston steadily amassed a local following as he gifted copies of his albums to anyone who would take them. Johnston also began playing acoustic guitar during this time, inspired by the Austin based guitarists.

In the documentary "The Devil and Daniel Johnston", tapes dated January 3rd – 5th 1985 are shown during playback of Johnston describing symptoms of Manic Depression, suggesting the Johnston had been recently diagnosed at that time, although the lyrics to 'Keep Punching Joe' from Hi, How Are You make direct reference to manic depression.

The album also features Johnston turning to a shorter song-writing format; while most songs on 'Retired Boxer' had been over 3 minutes, Respect is primarily made up of shorter tracks averaging around 1-2 minutes. It also features two covers, a Bert Berns song 'A Little Bit Of Soap' and 'Heartbreak Hotel', by Elvis Presley, both of which influenced the album's sound direction.

Promotion 
In 1985, Johnston began to perform live in concert, firstly opening for the local band Glass Eye. After this he continued to perform sporadic 2 - 3 song sets in local clubs, including a June 29th, performance at Woodshock 85, as well as a televised single song performance on the MTV program 'The Cutting Edge' filmed on August 24th.

Legacy 
In 2004, two songs from 'Respect' were included on the official tribute album 'The Late Great Daniel Johnston', 'Good Morning You' by The Rabbit, and 'Go' by Sparklehorse with The Flaming Lips. In 2020, Built To Spill, who had performed as Daniel Johnston's backing band in 2017, also included 'Good Morning You' on their album Built to Spill Plays the Songs of Daniel Johnston.

Track listing

1993 Abridged Vinyl 'Mini-Album' Version 
The 11" mini-album version released only in Spain in 1993 cuts the minute-long tape experiment 'Fast Go.' This retraction reduces the already short album to 29:15.

Release History

References 

Daniel Johnston albums
1985 albums